The Pacific Games (French: Jeux du Pacifique), is a continental multi-sport event held every four years among athletes from Oceania. The inaugural Games took place in 1963 in Suva, Fiji, and most recently in 2019 in Apia, Samoa. The Games were called the South Pacific Games from 1963 to 2007. The Pacific Games Council (PGC) organises the Games and oversees the host city's preparations. Athletes with a disability are included as full members of their national teams. In each sporting event, gold medals are awarded for first place, silver medals are awarded for second place, and bronze medals are awarded for third place.

Nine different cities in six countries and territories have hosted the Pacific Games. Four countries have hosted the games three times: Fiji (1963, 1979, 2003), New Caledonia (1966, 1987, 2011), Papua New Guinea (1969, 1991, 2015) and Samoa (1983, 2007, 2019). Two territories have hosted the Pacific Games twice: French Polynesia (1971, 1995) and Guam (1975, 1999). The Solomon Islands will become the seventh country to host the event come 2023.

Only six countries have attended every edition of the Pacific Games: Fiji, French Polynesia (Tahiti), New Caledonia, Papua New Guinea, Tonga, and Vanuatu. New Caledonia have dominated thirteen out of the sixteen Pacific Games, Papua New Guinea with two, and Fiji with one.

History

Concept 
The idea of holding the South Pacific Games originated with Dr A.H. Sahu Khan who was one of Fiji's representatives at a meeting of the South Pacific Commission held at Rabaul during 1959. The idea was adopted and led to a meeting of nine Territories, held in Nouméa during March 1961, which awarded Fiji the honour of hosting the very first Games.

Creation 
During 1962, the South Pacific Commission founded the South Pacific Games Council, with the first ever Games being held at Suva, Fiji. In the 40 years since, Games have been held in 12 countries and territories within the region. Initially the Games were held at three-year intervals although this was subsequently expanded to four following the Tumon Games in Guam.

As a residual consequence of the European colonisation of the Pacific from the early part of the 18th Century onwards, many nations who participated in the first Games (of 1963) were under predominantly British or French territorial rule. Understandably this generated a certain amount of confusion as both British and French flags and national anthems dominated proceedings and were occasionally used together for winning countries.
Western Samoa (now Samoa) was the only country with a flag and anthem of its sovereignty as it was the only participating independent island nation at that time. As time went on, fledgling nations gradually achieving sovereignty of their own sought to extricate themselves from their colonial past and new national anthems and flags emerged. Nevertheless, English and French remain the official languages of the Games.

Like other sporting events, the South Pacific Games has experienced slight controversies. A minor dispute that still continues today is the scheduling of events landing on a Sunday. Throughout the Pacific, the Christian Sabbath remains very important (sporting events or similar activity are illegal in Tonga for example) and scheduling at such a time would be frowned upon. The events themselves have also been affected by religious sensitivities, notably beach volleyball where the official uniform of bikinis for women has been forced to give way to more conservative attire. However other larger nations within the region or those loosely associated with more secular states (e.g. Cook Islands (New Zealand), American Samoa (United States), and French Polynesia (France)) are more moderate in this regard.

Other global and regional events have also influenced and shaped the Games' history. In 1995, the year Papeete, Tahiti hosted the Games, many countries took the decision to boycott as a direct protest at French nuclear testing in the Pacific. The Games, however, returned to near full regional participation in the following event in 1999, held on Guam.

The first objective of the Pacific Games Council, according to its Charter, is  "To create bonds of kindred friendship and brotherhood amongst people of the countries of the Pacific region through sporting exchange without any distinctions as to race, religion or politics." The Games were initiated to promote and develop sport amongst the nations and peoples of the South Pacific. After fifty years in existence, The South Pacific Commission changed its name to the Pacific Community.

Modern day games 
The XII South Pacific Games held in Suva, Fiji saw for the first time the introduction of a full program of 32 sports. That program included sports that are synonymous with the Pacific region as well as sports that have a limited participation and are generally not well established.

A strong corporate sponsorship package a first for the games enabled the organizers to work with a free hand towards their aims of making the games a success. A colorful and effective media and publicity campaign generated much interest and enthusiasm among the public in Fiji. Schools and youth groups were involved in interactive programs such as the adopt-a-country program also a first for the games.

The XIII Pacific Games were hosted in Apia, Samoa. They were the 13th to have been held since 1963. In contrast to the Olympic Games which are expected to generate income for the host nation, the 2007 Pacific Games were expected to leave Samoa US$92million in debt, predominantly as a result of expenditure on large-scale infrastructure projects such as bridges and roads.

Potential debt positions notwithstanding, five nations (Papua New Guinea, Vanuatu, Solomon Islands, Tonga and American Samoa) bid for the 2015 Pacific Games. The Games were ultimately awarded to Port Moresby, Papua New Guinea and follow the 2011 Pacific Games held in Nouméa, New Caledonia. However the rising cost (purportedly in excess of $1 billion) and the logistical burden of putting on the games continue to threaten countries' abilities to host the event.

Pacific Games Council 
The games governing body is the Pacific Games Council. The Games council flag is presented to the host nation of the next games at the end of every games. With expansion and economic growth in the Pacific and Oceania countries of the Pacific Islands, the South Pacific Games Council decided to modernise and revise its charter in light of these changes in the region and the changing place of Sport in our society, thus the council adapted a new charter in 2007.

The current President of the Council is Vidhya Lakhan from Fiji.

Member associations 
Membership of the Council includes internationally recognised National Multisport Organisations within countries and territories who are members of the Pacific Community. There are currently 22 members. Pitcairn Island is the only Pacific Community member that is not member of the Pacific Council, whereas Norfolk Island was admitted as a member of the Pacific Games Council although not a member of the Pacific Community.

15 members are also member associations of the Oceania National Olympic Committees (ONOC). Since the 2015 games Australia and New Zealand participate in the Pacific Games.

In July 2014, the Oceania National Olympic Committees announced their members had voted to allow Australia and New Zealand to participate in four sports, on a provisional basis, in the 2015 Pacific Games. The risk of seeing the two wealthy, developed nations dominate the competition had previously prevented their inclusion. They would be allowed to send participants only in rugby sevens, sailing, taekwondo and weightlifting - sports where other Pacific countries had proved sufficiently competitive against them in the past. In 2019, New Zealand was allowed to compete in men's football with an under-23 squad.

List of Pacific Games

Editions

Sports
There are 37 sports approved by the Pacific Games Council, as at December 2017. In accordance with the Pacific Games Charter, a maximum 24 sports shall be contested at the 2023 Pacific Games.

Core sports
The number of Pacific Games core sports is 17, effective for the 2023 Games. The core sports are required to be included at every edition of the games. Sailing and Triathlon were made core sports in 2016, and Archery was added in 2021.

Details for each core sport, up to and including the 2023 games, are presented in the table below:

Optional sports
There are 20 sports optional for inclusion at a games, as selected by the host nation's organising committee. Details for each optional sport, up to and including the 2019 games, are presented in the table below:

Former sports
Former sports include rugby 15s (replaced by rugby 7s) and underwater fishing (last contested in 1999).	

Also included at the 2009 Pacific Mini Games was rugby league 7s (now replaced by rugby league 9s).

Notes:
 The 3x3 format was added as an extra discipline for basketball in 2019 after being included at the Mini Games in 2017.

 Volleyball and beach volleyball disciplines have been listed as one sport for the purposes of the Games program since some time after the bids for the XV Games (in conjunction with the maximum number of sports being reduced from 28 to 26 for the XVI Games).

 Netball is a women's competition only.

 Touch rugby is an optional sport but men's, women's and mixed tournaments must be included if touch rugby is selected.

All-time medal table 
Officially the final medal tally of the Games does not recognize a winner, regarding competition and fair play more highly.

Australia and New Zealand were included in the all-time medal count for the first time after the 2015 Pacific Games in Port Moresby, Papua New Guinea. The table below includes all Games from 1963 to 2019.

Nation(s) in italics are defunct PGAs.

See also 
The Pacific Community
 Pacific Mini Games
 Olympic Games
 Youth Olympic Games
 Commonwealth Games
 Commonwealth Youth Games
 Micronesian Games
 Asian Indoor and Martial Arts Games
 Jeux de la Francophonie

References

Sources

External links 
 List of South Pacific Games and Mini Games on www.rsssf.com by Rec.Sport.Soccer Statistics Foundation

Archive

 
Multi-sport events in Oceania
Oceanian international sports competitions
Recurring sporting events established in 1963